Kim Song-nam is a North Korean table tennis player. He competed at the 2012 Summer Olympics in the Men's singles, but was defeated in the first round.

References

External links

 

Year of birth missing (living people)
North Korean male table tennis players
Living people
Olympic table tennis players of North Korea
Table tennis players at the 2012 Summer Olympics
21st-century North Korean people